Irene Doutney (1949/50 – 11 June 2018) was an Australian politician, who was a councillor of the City of Sydney for the Greens New South Wales. In 2016, she became Deputy Lord Mayor of Sydney.

Early life 
Doutney grew up in King's Cross, Australia. Her father died of leukemia when she was 9 years old. Starting at age 12, Doutney battled depression. Her mother was diagnosed with terminal cancer when Doutney was 16. She has a Bachelor of Arts degree in history.

Career 
Doutney became involved in community issues through the group REDWatch. She was first elected as a Greens councillor to the City of Sydney in 2008, and re-elected for a second term in 2012. On 29 February 2016, the Sydney Council elected Doutney the new Deputy Lord Mayor following the death of Robyn Kemmis. The election followed an agreement between Green Councillor Doutney and Independent Lord Mayor Clover Moore that Doutney would support Moore's budgetary measures but remain free to object to other proposals.

One of Doutney's signature issues as a public official was advocating for improved public housing. Her first act as an elected councilor was to speak out against the Northern Territory intervention for the Aboriginal rights Coalition.

Doutney was a "78er", having participated in the first Sydney Gay and Lesbian Mardi Gras in 1978, and continued to advocate for marriage equality and LGBT rights. Doutney lead the ultimately successful push for the City of Sydney to divest from fossil fuels. She advocated for urban forest, leading the City of Sydney adopting the Greening Sydney strategy. In 2016, she announced she would not contest the September 2016 elections for the City of Sydney.

Death 
Doutney died on 11 June 2018 at the St Vincents Sacred Heart Hospice after a 3-year battle with cancer.

References 

20th-century births
2018 deaths
Politicians from Sydney
21st-century Australian politicians
21st-century Australian women politicians
Sydney City Councillors
Australian Greens politicians
Deputy Lord Mayors of Sydney
Women local councillors in Australia
People associated with Kings Cross, New South Wales